Fabio Costa (born 27 November 1977 in Camaçari, Bahia) is a former Brazilian goalkeeper.

Career 
Costa played for Brazil under-23 and won the 1996 Toulon Tournament and the 2000 South American Pre-Olympic Tournament. He was part of the Brazil under-23 team who competed at the 2000 Summer Olympics in Sydney, headed by coach Luxemburgo.

Still uncapped for the senior national team, he was summoned by coach Emerson Leão for the 2001 FIFA Confederations Cup to be hosted by Japan and South Korea, but did not enter the field during the competition.

In 2010, he played only in the international friendly between Santos x Red Bull / NY.

On 16 December 2013, Costa, who has his contract ended in last day of the year, announced his retirement of football. According to him: "It was 21 years as a professional footballer, I have played since I was 15 years old. I lost my joy of playing. I have no hurts from Santos, I just stay sad for being not chosen."

Honours

Club 
Vitória
 Bahia State League: 1995, 1996, 1997
 Nordeste Cup: 1997, 1998
 Brazilian Cup: 1997

Santos
 Brazilian League: 2002
 São Paulo State League: 2006, 2007

Corinthians
 Brazilian League: 2005

International 
Brazil U23
 Toulon Tournament: 1996
 Pre-Olympic Tournament: 2000

Individual 
 Bola de Prata: 2005
 Campeonato Brasileiro Série A Team of the Year: 2005

References

External links 

 santos.globo.com 

1977 births
Living people
Brazilian footballers
Brazilian expatriate footballers
Association football goalkeepers
Footballers at the 2000 Summer Olympics
Olympic footballers of Brazil
Campeonato Brasileiro Série A players
Esporte Clube Bahia players
Cruzeiro Esporte Clube players
PSV Eindhoven players
Esporte Clube Vitória players
Santos FC players
Clube Atlético Mineiro players
Sport Club Corinthians Paulista players
Associação Desportiva São Caetano players
2001 FIFA Confederations Cup players
People from Camaçari
Sportspeople from Bahia